Stewart Marsden Massey (1877-1934), was a male badminton player from England, and a writer on the sport, penning the first book devoted solely to it.

Badminton 
Massey born in Kensington  was a three times winner of the All England Open Badminton Championships. He won the first edition of the men's doubles during 1899 and then won two more titles in 1903 and 1905. He also competed in the first international badminton tournament outside the UK, in Dieppe, France.

Writing 

Massey wrote for the Badminton Magazine (e.g. February 1907), and  the Badminton Gazette, of which he was, from November 1907, the founding editor, eventually being succeeded by George Thomas.

His 1911 book, Badminton, was the first on the sport.

References

Sources 

 

English male badminton players
1877 births
1934 deaths